Medzibrodie nad Oravou is a village and municipality in Dolný Kubín District in the Žilina Region of northern Slovakia. It stands at 549 m (1801 ft) and has a population of 475.

References

External links
 Medzibrodie nad Oravo Municipal Website (with translation)

Villages and municipalities in Dolný Kubín District